The Highland Railway F class 4-4-0s were a class of British steam locomotives introduced in 1874. The first 10 were built by Dübs and Company in 1874.  A further seven were built in Lochgorm works between 1876 and 1888. Originally they were the first Bruce class, and later became known as the Duke class to avoid confusion with the second Bruce class. As part of Peter Drummond's 1901 classification scheme they became class F.

Dimensions

Disposal
Withdrawal commenced in 1907, and by 1909 all-but-one of the Dübs-built examples had been withdrawn. Numbers 31A and 74 were retired in 1913, number 71A was broken up in 1915. The remaining five survived until 1923 but none of them acquired a new London, Midland and Scottish Railway number.

Numbering

References

H. A. Vallance (1938) The Highland Railway

F Class
4-4-0 locomotives
Dübs locomotives
Railway locomotives introduced in 1874
Scrapped locomotives
Standard gauge steam locomotives of Great Britain
Passenger locomotives